The  is a botanical garden operated by Tohoku University at Kawauchi 12-2, Aoba-ku, Sendai, Miyagi Prefecture, Japan. It is open daily.

The garden was established in 1958. It now includes more than 800 species, with a particular focus on willows and alpine plants, as well as collections of Cactaceae and other succulents, Iris, Lilium, Paeonia, Rosa, Syringa, and conifers such as Podocarpus. Specific species include Belamcanda chinensis, Caltha palustris var. nipponica, Carex podogyna, Lysichiton camtschatcense, Menyanthes trifoliata, Myrica gale var. tomentosa, Potamogeton distinctus, and Primula japonica.

See also 
 List of botanical gardens in Japan

References 
 Botanical Garden of Tohoku University
 Campus map with botanical garden
 Student movie of botanical garden
 Jardins Botaniques Japonais entry (French)
 BGCI entry

Tohoku University
Botanical gardens in Japan
Gardens in Miyagi Prefecture